The Union of Factory Workers was a general union in Belgium.

Various local unions of factory workers formed in Belgium around the turn of the 20th-century.  In 1908, Christ Mahlman attempted to unite these unions as the Belgian Factory Workers' Union.  This struggled, but was refounded in 1910 as the "Union of Factory Workers", affiliated to the Trade Union Commission.  Initially a small organisation, with only 3,500 in 1913, it grew rapidly during World War I, and by 1920 it had 51,283 members.

The rapid growth of the union led it into multiple demarcation disputes with other unions.  As a result, at the start of 1921 it merged with the recently-founded Building and Wood Workers' Union, to form the General Union of Building, Furnishing and Other Industries.

The union was led by national secretary August De Bruyne.  From 1919, Dore Smets served as a district secretary.

References

Trade unions in Belgium
General unions
Trade unions established in 1908
1908 establishments in Belgium
Trade unions disestablished in 1921